The Rio Negro (Portuguese for "black river") is a river of Mato Grosso do Sul state in southwestern Brazil.

See also 
 List of rivers of Mato Grosso do Sul
 Pantanal jaguar

References

External links 
 Brazilian Ministry of Transport
 Rand McNally, The New International Atlas, 1993.

Rivers of Mato Grosso do Sul